Zhang Xiaoqiong (born 10 July 1966) is a Chinese sprinter. She competed in the women's 200 metres at the 1988 Summer Olympics.

References

External links
 

1966 births
Living people
Athletes (track and field) at the 1988 Summer Olympics
Chinese female sprinters
Olympic athletes of China
Place of birth missing (living people)
Olympic female sprinters
20th-century Chinese women